The 1950 Great Britain Lions tour was a tour by the Great Britain national rugby league team of Australia and New Zealand which took place between May and August 1950. The tour involved a schedule of 25 games: 19 in Australia including a three-test series against Australia for the Ashes, and a further 6 in New Zealand including two test matches against New Zealand. A scheduled fixture in Forbes, New South Wales, against a Western Districts team, was abandoned when the chartered plane could not land due to bad weather. 
Captained by Ernest Ward, the Lions returned home having won 19 and lost 6 of their games. The team won the first test match of the tour but lost the second and third to lose the Ashes Test series to Australia. The team also lost both Test Matches in and against New Zealand. 
Despite being a British team – five of the squad were Welsh – the team played, and were often referred to by both the press at home and away, as England.

Squad

Tom Spedding was the Team Manager, and George Oldroyd was the Business Manager, of the touring party.

Australian Leg

1st Test

2nd Test

3rd Test

New Zealand leg

1st Test

2nd Test

Sources

References

Great Britain national rugby league team tours
Rugby league tours of Australia
Rugby league tours of New Zealand
Great Britain Lions tour of Australia and New Zealand
Great Britain Lions tour of Australia and New Zealand
Great Britain Lions tour of Australia and New Zealand